Yan Zi and Zheng Jie were the defending champions, but none competed this year.

Katarina Srebotnik and Ai Sugiyama won the title by defeating Edina Gallovits and Olga Govortsova 6–2, 6–2 in the final.

Seeds
The top 4 seeds receive a bye into the second round.

Draw

Key
 WC = Wild card
 r = Retired
 w/o = Walkover

Finals

Top half

Bottom half

External links
 Official results archive (ITF)
 Official results archive (WTA)

2008
2008 WTA Tour